In the mathematical theory of knots, the Thurston–Bennequin number, or Bennequin number, of a front diagram of a Legendrian knot is defined as the writhe of the diagram minus the number of right cusps.  It is named after William Thurston and Daniel Bennequin.

The maximum Thurston–Bennequin number over all Legendrian representatives of a knot is a topological knot invariant.

References

Knot theory